Tapetosa is a genus of spiders in the family Lycosidae. It was first described in 2009 by Framenau et al.. , it contains only one species, Tapetosa darwini, found in western Australia.

References

Lycosidae
Monotypic Araneomorphae genera
Spiders of Australia